Live sand, a term used in aquarism, is natural reef coral sand populated with millions of beneficial bacteria and organisms which aid in the dissolving of organic wastes like ammonia, nitrites and nitrates produced by larger organisms in saltwater aquariums. Live sand can be purchased from aquarium stores, but most hobbyists make their own by seeding dead sand with live sand from other aquarium systems.

See also
 Filter (aquarium)
 Live rock
 Reef aquarium
 Sand

Further reading 
 Advanced Marine Aquarium Techniques, by Jay Hemdal

Fishkeeping
Aquariums